Nurly Zhol is a US$9 billion domestic economic stimulus plan to develop and modernize roads, railways, ports, IT infrastructure, and education and civil services in the Republic of Kazakhstan. The Nurly Zhol plan was announced by Kazakhstan's President Nursultan Nazarbayev in November 2014.

Areas of infrastructure development
Nurly Zhol targets seven areas of infrastructure development: 
 transportation and logistics infrastructure
 industrial infrastructure
 energy infrastructure
 public utilities infrastructure
 housing infrastructure
 social infrastructure
 small and medium-sized enterprises

Goals
Nurly Zhol is intended to turn Kazakhstan into a key Eurasian transport and logistics hub by modernizing roads, railways and ports, among others projects. Over $40 billion of projects are to be implemented within the Nurly Zhol framework by 2020. 1.4 million square meters of rental housing is expected to be constructed in 2015-2019. The New Economic Policy "Nurly Zhol" is expected to create over 200,000 new jobs.

Results
Development of education infrastructure is an important component of Nurly Zhol. For example, within the Nurly Zhol program Karaganda region built four new education facilities.

Implementation of the Nurly Zhol program helped create 105,000 jobs and provided for a 1% GDP growth in 2016. Also, 611 km of roads were commissioned in 2016 as part of Nurly Zhol. In his State of the Nation address, President Nazarbayev said that, due to Nurly Zhol, Kazakhstan is in the beginning of a "complex global transformation."

Approximately US$2.2 billion has been allocated under Nurly Zhol to improve highway quality. 426 km of roads were commissioned in 2018.

, access to clean public water supply was 92.6% (urban — 97.2%, rural — 86.4%). Prime Minister Askar Mamin promised 100% access to high-quality drinking water by 2025 under the program.

Nurly Zhol 20202025
The Nurly Zhol state infrastructure development programme for 2020-2025 focuses on developing road infrastructure. The programme aims to repair 27,000 kilometres of local roads, reconstruct 10,000 kilometres and repair 11,000 kilometres of national roads. The Kazakh Government estimated that the 2020-2025 programme would cost the country US$16.91 billion. It also plans to electrify approximately 1,033 km of railway tracks over the time period. , only about 40% of the country's 16,000 km railway tracks are electrified.

As part of Kazakhstan’s Nurly Zhol infrastructure program, the country has a goal of improving up to 95% of local roads by the year 2025. 75% of local roads were improved by 2020.

References

Nursultan Nazarbayev
Economy of Kazakhstan